Rang may refer to:
 Rang (1993 film), a Bollywood romance film
 Rang (2014 film), a Tulu film
 Rang (TV channel), an Assamese language television channel 
 Rang, Doubs, a commune in the Doubs department, France

See also